The Royal Victoria Infirmary (RVI) is a 673-bed tertiary referral hospital and research centre in Newcastle upon Tyne, England, with strong links to Newcastle University.
The hospital is part of the Newcastle upon Tyne Hospitals NHS Foundation Trust and is a designated academic health science centre.

History 

The original hospital was the Newcastle upon Tyne Infirmary at Forth Banks which was funded by way of public subscription. The foundation stone was laid by Joseph Butler, the Bishop of Durham, on 5 September 1751 and it opened on 8 October 1752. By the end of the 19th century, despite major extensions including the Dobson Wing which opened in 1855 and the Ravensworth Wards which opened in 1885, the infirmary became overcrowded and needed to be replaced.

It was opened by King Edward VII on 11 July 1906. The fully furnished and equipped hospital, containing seventeen wards, a nurses' home, chapel and five operating theatres, cost over £300,000. A statue of Queen Victoria in front of the new infirmary, sculpted by Sir George James Frampton in white stone, was the gift of Sir Riley Lord, who was knighted for his efforts in getting the infirmary built. The infirmary became a unit of the First Northern General Hospital and treated wounded service personnel during the First World War.

The Royal Victoria Infirmary had close links with King's College, Durham and, after it was formed, with Newcastle University as a major teaching hospital from when the university medical school was opened by King George VI in 1939.

Overcrowding was a problem, with waiting lists of over 5,000 in the 1930s and, until it joined the National Health Service in 1948, money had to be raised for extensions and new equipment – always difficult especially in the depression years. Later additions to the hospital included the Dental Hospital and School in 1978 and the Medical School in 1985. These additions were followed by Leazes Wing (facing Leazes Park) in 1992, the Sir James Spence Institute (named after Sir James Spence, a leading pediatrician) in 1994 and the Claremont Wing (on Claremont Road) in 1996. Although the Peacock Hall (the main administrative building) survived, many of the Edwardian buildings, including the old Eastern Block, were demolished at this time to make way for the new structures.

The late 20th century also brought consolidation of medical services in the city including the transfer to the infirmary of children's services from the Fleming Memorial Hospital in 1988 and of maternity services from the Princess Mary Maternity Hospital in 1993.

A major expansion of the site, including the New Victoria Wing, which includes a state-of-the-art accident and emergency department replacing that of the Newcastle General Hospital, and a new children's facility known as the Great North Children's Hospital was procured under a Private Finance Initiative contract in 2005. It was built by Laing O'Rourke at a cost of £150 million and opened in 2010.

Facilities 
The hospital has three main wings: the Leazes Wing, the Claremont Wing and the New Victoria Wing. The Great North Children's Hospital, one of only fourteen major children's medical centres in the UK, adjoins the New Victoria Wing. The infirmary is also the only provider of Mohs micrographic surgery for skin cancer in the North East of England.

See also 
 List of hospitals in England

References

External links 

 
 

NHS hospitals in England
Teaching hospitals in England
Buildings at Newcastle University
Hospitals in Tyne and Wear
Hospital buildings completed in 1906
1906 establishments in England